Environmental dumping is the practice of transfrontier shipment of waste (household waste, industrial/nuclear waste, etc.) from one country to another. The goal is to take the waste to a country that has less strict environmental laws, or environmental laws that are not strictly enforced. The economic benefit of this practice is cheap disposal or recycling of waste without the economic regulations of the original country.

An example of an attempt at environmental dumping is the story of the decommissioned French aircraft carrier, the FS Clemenceau, which was originally sold to a ship breaking yard in Gujarat India to be demolished and recycled as scrap.  The Indian Supreme Court ruled in 2006 that it could not enter Indian waters due to the high level of toxic waste and 700 tons of asbestos present on the ship, forcing the French government to take the Clemenceau back. The ship was subsequently blocked from entering the Suez Canal for the same reason. In 2009, the task of recycling the vessel was ultimately taken over by specialist recyclers at Hartlepool in the United Kingdom.

Environmental dumping
The shipment of waste between countries has been referred to as “transfrontier shipment” of waste.  Transfrontier waste is shipped within the European Union (EU) and between the European Union and other countries.  Most of this waste is traded by Organization for Economic Co-operation and Development (OECD) countries.  The waste is typically non-hazardous and includes metals, plastics, and paper products.  In 2007, it is estimated that OECD countries exported between 4 and 5 million tons of metal and paper waste.  OECD countries also exported near a half of million tons of recovered plastics in 2007.  Some of these wastes that are transported can be hazardous waste.  These hazardous wastes can cause potential health risks to humans and the environment.  According to the Basel Convention, there is at least 8 million tons of hazardous waste imported and exported every year.

The Basel Convention was created in 1989 but started enforcing rules in 1992. The purpose of the convention is to control the hazardous waste that was imported and exported throughout the EU.   The convention is a great contributor to stopping the shipment of illegal waste.  In May 2005, 60 containers were seized that were on their way from the United Kingdom to China.  The containers seized by Dutch authorities were supposed to be for paper but actually contained household wastes.  Since neither the UK, China, nor Dutch had agreed to the importation of the wastes, the waste was shipped back.  The Basel Convention also deals with the popular growing issue of E-waste.  The Waste Shipment Regulation confirms what can be shipped to, from, and between EU countries.  These regulation rules divide the waste into three separate lists: Green List, Amber List, and Red List.
 Green List
 These items are considered to be non-hazardous and more environmentally friendly.  Some of these items may include paper and plastic that can be recycled.  These types of shipment don’t have to receive prior permission to cross international waters and be shipped to parts of the European Union.
 Amber List
 Materials are considered to be mixed on this list containing both non-hazardous and hazardous parts.  These materials can contain metal bearing wastes, organic and inorganic wastes, and/or organic or inorganic constituents. A company or country shipping these items would have to have prior consent before exporting the materials. As of 2007, consent for the shipment of waste is received by Dublin City Council.
 Red List
 This includes reasonably hazardous materials. These materials contain principally organic or inorganic constituents, which include polychlorinated biphenyl (PCBs).

Ocean dumping

Shipment of waste from country to country can also involve dumping waste into the ocean. Ocean dumping has been a problem since the 19th century. In the United States, it was legal to dump industrial waste into the ocean until the Ocean Dumping Act was passed in 1972. During the years of 1970 and 1980 alone, it was estimated that 25 million tons of waste including scrap metal, chemicals, and acids were dumped into the ocean. Ocean dumping can lead to eutrophication which depletes the oxygen from the water, in turn killing marine life. Ocean dumping is placed into three lists: Gray List, Black List, and White List.
Gray List: Water is highly contaminated and toxic on the gray list. Some of the contaminants include arsenic, lead, acids, nickel, chromium, scrap metals, and radioactive materials.
Black List: The materials listed on the black list include mercury, cadmium, plastic, oil products, radioactive waste, and anything that is solely made for biological and chemical warfare. The materials on this list are highly potent and hazardous.
White List: The white list contains every other material not already mentioned in the above lists. This list is used to make sure nothing will be dumped into the ocean and disturb or damage the coral reef ecosystems.

The most recent example of hazardous waste being dumped into the ocean occurred along Côte d'Ivoire in Africa in 2006. Hundreds of tons of waste product were dumped into the ocean from a ship by the name of Probo Koala. The ship was chartered by an international oil trader in the Netherlands. The incident precipitated a health crisis and impacted the health of 100 000 people in the vicinity. The oil trader (Trafigura) paid 200 million dollars to help with cleanup. The owner of the local company that was responsible for disposing the chemicals in various places was given 20 years in jail.

In the European Union, new regulations on the shipment of hazardous and non-hazardous materials were implemented in 2007. According to the new regulations, the EU will no longer be able to export their hazardous wastes to developing countries that do not have the capabilities to deal with the waste in an environmentally friendly way. E-waste, such as computers, cannot be shipped to countries that are not in the EU or the European Free Trade Association. States and countries that are members of the EU or EFTA must conduct inspections periodically to make sure that all regulations are being followed and physically check containers to verify that the containers hold only what is authorized. Finally, if the country that is taking the waste is unable to accept or dispose of the waste then the sender must pay to take their waste back.

Ship dismantling
Ship dismantling is another form of trans frontier waste that is shipped from country to country.  Many ships are broken down into parts that can be recycled.  Many parts of the ships are hazardous and can potentially pollute the areas that they are broken down in.  The ship parts can contain asbestos, PCB's, and oil sludge.  All of these components can be a potential health risk and harm the environment.  Most ship scrapping industries are in developing countries where the laws (environmentally as well as occupationally) are not as strict as in developed countries.  International Maritime Organization states that India is the leader in ship dismantling, followed by China, Bangladesh, and Pakistan.

The aircraft carrier Clemenceau was denied access to Indian waters because it contained asbestos.  The French aircraft was carried from France to Britain to be recycled on February 8, 2009, despite the abundance of asbestos.

The EU Commission proposed improvements to be made to improve the ship dismantling as well as the ocean dumping process on November 19, 2008. Public consultations were held in 2009, and stakeholder workshops were organized between 2009 and 2011. On March 26, 2009, the EU Parliament adopted a resolution on the Communication that was adopted by the Commission on October 21, 2009.

The European Council's Conclusions endorse the Hong Kong Convention on environmentally responsible ship recycling, adopted in May 2009. According to the International Maritime Organization, he Hong Kong Convention “intends to address all the issues around ship recycling, including the fact that ships sold for scrapping may contain environmentally hazardous substances such as asbestos, heavy metals, hydrocarbons, ozone-depleting substances and others. It also addresses concerns raised about the working and environmental conditions at many of the world's ship recycling locations.”
recycling is very important when it comes to recycling devices

See also 

 Chemical Waste Management, Inc. v. Hunt
 City of Philadelphia v. New Jersey
 Environmental justice
 Environmental protection
 Environmental racism
 Global environmental inequality
 Global waste trade
 NIMBY
 Pollution haven hypothesis
 Pollution in China
 Pollution is Colonialism
 Sacrifice zone
 Toxic colonialism
 Toxic waste dumping by the 'Ndrangheta

References

Further reading
 Canneman, Willem. "Riding the waves Shipping waste from Europe to China." Waste-Management-World.com  Dec. 2008. 6 Feb. 2009
 Commission of the European Communities. "Communication from the Commission to the European Parliament, The Council, the European Economic and Social Committee and the Committee of the Regions" 19 Nov. 2008. Web. 10 Feb. 2009 
 Environment Directorate-General of the European Commission. "Waste Shipments." EUROPA.com 30 Aug. 2007. Web. 4 Feb. 2009. 
 "EU waste-shipment rules tightened." EurActive.com. 12 July 2007. Web. 6 Feb 2009. 
 ec.europa.eu/environment/impel
 "Ocean Dumping Grounds." MarineBio.org. 5 Feb. 2009 
 Tibbets, John. "Hazardous Waste. Constructing Rules for Dismantling Ships", Environmental Health Perspectives. 109.11 (2001): A522.
 "Transfrontier shipment of waste." Environmental Protection Agency. 2006. Web. 4 Feb. 2009. 
 "Notes on ship recycling convention for maritime students." maritime education - kaizad.tk 
 "Transport of non-hazardous waste." 2008. Web. 8 Feb 2009.

Protectionism
Waste management